Zhang Yujie (born 18 March 2002) is a Chinese footballer currently playing as a midfielder for Kunshan.

Career statistics

Club
.

Notes

References

2002 births
Living people
Chinese footballers
Association football midfielders
China League Two players
Guangzhou F.C. players
Hubei Istar F.C. players